Jason Coles (born 16 September 1973) is a British retired professional ice hockey defenceman. He is currently the head of the Wightlink Tigers in the English National Ice Hockey League (NIHL).

Coles played four seasons (1990 - 1994) of major junior hockey in the Ontario Hockey League (OHL), scoring 13 goals and 20 assists for 24 points, while earning 310 penalty minutes, in 186 games played.

He began his professional career during the 1993-94 season with the St. Thomas Wildcats of the Colonial Hockey League. He went on to play 17 seasons, predominantly with the Wightlink Raiders of the English Premier Ice Hockey League, but also with the Bracknell Bees of the British Ice Hockey Superleague, and in the ECHL with the Pee Dee Pride and Birmingham Bulls, before retiring as a player following the 2011-12 season.

With the 2012-13 season, Coles took on the position of head coach with the Wightlink Tigers of the English National Ice Hockey League after being a player-coach with the team the previous year.

Career statistics

References

External links
 

1973 births
Living people
Belleville Bulls players
Birmingham Bulls (ECHL) players
Bracknell Bees players
British ice hockey coaches
English ice hockey defencemen
Fayetteville Force players
Niagara Falls Thunder players
Pee Dee Pride players
Solihull Blaze players
St. Thomas Wildcats players
Wightlink Raiders players
Windsor Spitfires players
People from Chipping Norton